The commune of Le Tampon, in the French overseas department of Réunion, has been divided into two cantons since the canton reorganisation of March 2015. Their seat is in Le Tampon.

Cantons

References

Cantons of Réunion